Dion Drena Beljo (born 1 March 2002) is a Croatian professional footballer who plays as a forward for German  club FC Augsburg.

Club career
Born in Zagreb, Beljo started his career with Cibalia, playing for the club's youth teams. In the 2018−19 season, he started playing for the Cibalia first team in the Druga NL, the third tier of the Croatian football league system. In his debut season, he amassed ten goals and nine assists, while his team finished in first place and secured promotion to the Prva NL. In 2019 he moved to first division club NK Osijek, and in June 2020, he signed a professional contract with the club. In July 2021, he was loaned out to Istra 1961 for the 2021–22 season. Beljo was a starter for Istra, appearing in 34 league matches, in which he scored 15 goals. After the end of his loan spell, he returned to Osijek, where he scored eight goals in 15 appearances during the first half of the 2022–23 season.

On 13 January 2023, Beljo joined FC Augsburg on a four-and-a-half year contract for €3 million fee. He made his Bundesliga debut on 22 January in a 3–4 loss against Borussia Dortmund. On 4 March 2023, he scored his first goal in a 2-1 win over SV Werder Bremen.

Personal life
Beljo is named Dion after Dionysus, the Greek god of wine, while Drena was his grandfather's nickname.

Career statistics

Club

Honours
Individual
Croatian Cup Top goalscorer: 2021–22

References

External links
 
 
 

2002 births
Footballers from Zagreb
Living people
Croatian footballers
Association football forwards
Croatia youth international footballers
Croatia under-21 international footballers
HNK Cibalia players
NK Osijek players
NK Istra 1961 players
FC Augsburg players
First Football League (Croatia) players
Second Football League (Croatia) players
Croatian Football League players
Bundesliga players
Croatian expatriate footballers
Expatriate footballers in Germany
Croatian expatriate sportspeople in Germany